Dalry Road railway station served the area of Dalry, Edinburgh, Scotland from 1900 to 1962 on the Leith Branch.

History 
The station opened on 2 July 1900 by the Caledonian Railway. It closed to passengers on 30 April 1962. The line closed two years later, in 1964.

References

External links 

Disused railway stations in Edinburgh
Railway stations in Great Britain opened in 1900
Railway stations in Great Britain closed in 1962
Former Caledonian Railway stations
1900 establishments in Scotland
1962 disestablishments in Scotland